Charistica is a genus of moths in the family Gelechiidae.

Species
 Charistica caeligena (Meyrick, 1922)
 Charistica callichroma (Meyrick, 1914)
 Charistica exteriorella (Walker, 1864)
 Charistica ioploca (Meyrick, 1922)
 Charistica iriantha (Meyrick, 1914)
 Charistica porphyraspis (Meyrick, 1909)
 Charistica rhodopetala (Meyrick, 1922)
 Charistica sandaracota (Meyrick, 1914)
 Charistica walkeri (Walsingham, 1911)

References

 
Gelechiinae
Taxa named by Edward Meyrick
Moth genera